Dissociative disorder not otherwise specified (DDNOS) was a mental health diagnosis for pathological dissociation that matched the DSM-IV criteria for a dissociative disorder, but did not fit the full criteria for any of the specifically identified subtypes, and the reasons why the previous diagnoses were not met are specified. The International Statistical Classification of Diseases and Related Health Problems (ICD-10) refers to the diagnosis as "Other dissociative and conversion disorders". Under the fifth edition of the Diagnostic and Statistical Manual of Mental Disorders (DSM), it is known as "Other specified dissociative disorder" (OSDD).

DDNOS diagnoses 
Under DDNOS, there were a number of dissociative conditions.

 DDNOS 1 - DID but switching not observed by clinician, or amnesia for the significant past but not everyday life.
 DDNOS 1a - Like DID but with less distinct parts/no alters. Alters may be emotional fragments or the same individual at different ages. Can experience emotional amnesia rather than physical amnesia.
 DDNOS 1b - Like DID but no amnesia between alters.
 DDNOS 2 - Derealization without Depersonalization.
 DDNOS 3,4,5,etc. - DID but with specific symptoms. Eg) Identity change due to brainwashing, acute dissociative reaction, dissociative trance, Ganser Syndrome.
 Dissociative Disorder with Unclear Symptoms.

See also

 Biopsychiatry controversy
 Identity
 Jamais vu
 Memory
 Posttraumatic stress disorder
Multiplicity

References

External links 
American Psychiatric Association proposed revision of DSM-5 entry

Dissociative disorders